Coninckiidae is a family of nematodes belonging to the order Araeolaimida.

Genera:
 Coninckia Gerlach, 1956

References

Nematodes